Omboué Airport  is an airport serving Omboué in Ogooué-Maritime Province, Gabon.

See also

 List of airports in Gabon
 Transport in Gabon

References

External links
 HERE/Nokia - Omboué
 OurAirports - Omboué
 OpenStreetMap - Omboué
 Omboué

Airports in Gabon